The Secretary of the Army Award for Valor was established 15 April 2002, to acknowledge acts of heroism or bravery connected with an Army employee or Army activity, or that in some way benefits the Army. The performance of the act must be evidenced by voluntary action above and beyond the call of duty.  The equivalent military decoration for this award is the Soldier's Medal.

Criteria
To be eligible for consideration for this award, the employee must have distinguished themselves by exhibiting great courage or sacrifice involving heroism or bravery. The performance of the act must be a voluntary action above and beyond the call of duty. The act may be recognized if it is connected with an Army employee or Army activity, or if the Army in some way benefits from the act. Awards will be made only to recognize single acts of heroism or bravery.  This award is not presented in recognition of activities or conflict with an armed enemy. The situation must have involved personal hazard or danger and the voluntary risk of life. Awards are not made solely for saving a life.

Appearance
The obverse depicts a five pointed star on top of a laurel wreath. At the top of the medal is inscribed "VALOR". The reverse of the medal has a small laurel wreath under a rectangular plate for engraving the recipient's name. The words “AWARDED TO” are inscribed above and parallel to the name plate. Below the plate are the words “FOR EXHIBITING BRAVERY”. The medal is suspended from a ribbon , in width in old glory red. In the center of the ribbon are five stripes of ultramarine blue, separated by four stripes of white, the center blue stripe being wider than the others. This award has a neck drape or neck ribbon, similar to that of the Medal of Honor, and therefore is worn by the recipient in formal attire around the neck as the Medal of Honor. These are two of the four U.S. awards that are authorized a neck ribbon, the other ones being the commander-degree Legion of Merit and the Presidential Medal of Freedom.

Known recipients
 Arden E. John, for selfless service beyond the call of duty on December 22, 2006. Mr. John risked his life to rescue a drowning man at a pond in South Korea. He went into freezing water and pulled one of the men to shore and administered CPR and continued to administer aid until medical personal arrived.
Michael G. Cahill, for courageous actions at the Fort Hood shooting 5 November 2009; presented posthumously on 5 November 2010.
 Kimberly Munley, civilian police officer, wounded, and for valor at the Fort Hood shooting 5 November 2009; presented 5 November 2010.
 Mark Todd, Sr., civilian police officer, for valorous actions at the Fort Hood shooting 5 November 2009; presented 5 November 2010.
 Carl Marchlewicz, mechanical engineer, for bravery rescuing six children from a burning house on 7 May 2013; presented 6 May 2014.
 William Allis, fireman, for actions in saving two people from drowning on 6 August 2013; presented 5 November 2014.
 Sherman L. Fleek, Command Historian, U.S. Military Academy, West Point, NY, for bravery while disrupting an armed robbery at a restaurant on 31 May 2015; presented 25 May 2016 in the Pentagon.
 Robert L. Henderson, Army Corps of Engineers Natural Resource Specialist (Park Ranger) for disrupting and preventing a potential active shooter situation at Lake O' the Pines, Jefferson, Texas on December 29, 2016; presented 25 October 2017.
 Tanya C. Porter, Clinical Staff Nurse, U.S. Army Medical Command, Madigan Army Medical Center, Tacoma, WA, for selfless service and personal courage treating wounded passengers and directly saving at least two lives during the 2017 Washington train derailment; presented 1 June 2018 at the Pentagon.
 William S. Kiernan, Lieutenant, West Point Fire and Emergency Services at the U.S. Military Academy, for rescuing a victim from a submerged vehicle that crashed into a swamp, and rendering aid until further help arrived.  Awarded Feb 2019 at the U.S. Military Academy

See also
 Awards and decorations of the United States government

References

Awards and decorations of the United States Department of Defense